The Dos de Mayo or Second of May Uprising took place in Madrid, Spain, on 2–3 May 1808. The rebellion, mainly by civilians, with some isolated military action by junior officers, was against the occupation of the city by French troops, and was violently repressed by the French Imperial forces, with hundreds of public executions.

Background

The city had been under the occupation of Napoleon's army since 23 March of the same year. King Charles IV had been forced by the Spanish people during the Tumult of Aranjuez to abdicate in favor of his son Ferdinand VII, and at the time of the uprising both were in the French city of Bayonne at the insistence of Napoleon. An attempt by the French general Joachim Murat to move their daughter and her children along with the youngest son of Charles IV to Bayonne sparked a rebellion.

Social aspects
The Dos de Mayo was among the few spontaneous popular uprisings of the war, launched without significant fore-planning, funding, or leadership by government elites. While elements within the Spanish military and state bureaucracy did envision military action to expel the French from the country, Murat's hold on Madrid was held to be unassailable in the short term. The two most senior uniformed leaders involved in the Dos de Mayo, Daoíz and Velarde y Santillán, were caught unprepared by the actions of the laboring poor: Velarde, a 28-year-old artillery captain, was secretly plotting a campaign elsewhere in the country, but considered a direct attack on the Spanish capital impractical – drawn to the sound of gunfire, he joined the fighting contrary to his own military instinct, and would perish leading the defense of the Monteleón artillery barracks.

Beginning of the uprising
On 2 May a crowd began to gather in front of the Royal Palace in Madrid. Those gathered entered the palace grounds in an attempt to prevent the removal of Francisco de Paula. Marshal Murat sent a battalion of grenadiers from the Imperial Guard to the palace along with artillery detachments. The latter opened fire on the assembled crowd, and the rebellion began to spread to other parts of the city.

What followed was street fighting in different areas of Madrid as the poorly armed population confronted the French troops. Murat had quickly moved the majority of his troops into the city and there was heavy fighting around the Puerta del Sol and the Puerta de Toledo. Marshal Murat imposed martial law in the city and assumed full control of the administration. Little by little the French regained control of the city, and many hundreds of people died in the fighting. The painting by the Spanish artist Goya, The Charge of the Mamelukes, portrays the street fighting that took place. The Mamelukes of the Imperial Guard fighting residents of Madrid in the Puerta del Sol, wearing turbans and using curved scimitars, provoked memories of the Muslim Spain. 

There were Spanish troops stationed in the city, but they remained confined to barracks. The only Spanish troops to disobey orders were from the artillery units at the barracks of Monteleón, who joined the uprising. Two officers of these troops, Luis Daoíz de Torres and Pedro Velarde y Santillán are still commemorated as heroes of the rebellion. Both died during the French assault of the barracks, as the rebels were reduced by vastly superior numbers.

Impact of the uprising

The repression following the crushing of the initial rebellion was harsh. Murat created a military commission on the evening of 2 May to be presided over by General Grouchy. This commission issued death sentences to all of those captured who were bearing weapons of any kind. In a statement issued that day Murat said: "The population of Madrid, led astray, has given itself to revolt and murder. French blood has flowed. It demands vengeance. All those arrested in the uprising, arms in hand, will be shot."

All public meetings were prohibited and an order was issued requiring all weapons to be handed in to the authorities. Hundreds of prisoners were executed the following day, a scene captured in a famous painting by Goya, The Third of May 1808. As the French had been attacked with a variety of improvised weapons, any craftsmen found with shearing scissors, kitchen knives, sewing needles or other tools of their trade were summarily shot. Only a handful of French-speaking madrileños were able to avoid execution by pleading in words intelligible to their executioners.

On the same 2 May, in the nearby town of Móstoles, the arrival of the news of the repression prompted Juan Pérez Villamil, who was secretary of the Admiralty and prosecutor of the Supreme War Council, to encourage the mayors of the town, Andrés Torrejón and Simón Hernández, to sign a declaration of war calling on all Spaniards to rise up against the invaders. The name of this declaration was "Bando de los alcaldes de Móstoles" or "bando de la Independencia" which means "Edict of the Independence".

Analysis
The Dos de Mayo uprising, together with the subsequent proclamation as king of Napoleon's brother Joseph resulted in a rebellion against French rule. While the French occupiers hoped that their rapid suppression of the uprising would demonstrate their control of Spain, the rebellion actually gave considerable impetus to the resistance.

Aftermath
The Dos de Mayo uprising put Iberia in revolt against French rule starting with the Action of Valdepeñas.

The Invasion of Portugal had started with the occupation of Lisbon in 1807. But the Dos de Mayo uprising started a rebellion in Portugal with the Combat of Padrões de Teixeira.

The British intervention started 
with the Battle of Roliça led by Wellington.

The Spanish conventional warfare started 
with the Battles of El Bruch.

Napoleon started his invasion of Spain with the Battle of Zornoza.

In popular culture
The Second of May is now a public holiday in the Community of Madrid. The place where the artillery barracks of Monteleón was located is now a square called the Plaza del Dos de Mayo, and the district surrounding the square is known as Malasaña in memory of one of the heroines of the revolt, the teenager Manuela Malasaña, who was executed by French troops in the aftermath of the revolt.

Several memorials to the heroes of 2 May are located over the city, including the Monumento a los Caídos por España (Monument to those who fell to their deaths for Spain).

Notes

References

See also
 Timeline of the Peninsular War

Further read

External links
 A Spanish language account of the events
 Napoleon's Total War
 

19th-century rebellions
Conflicts in 1808
Battles of the Peninsular War
Wars of independence
Battles involving France
Battles involving Spain
Battles in the Community of Madrid
History of Madrid
1808 in Spain
May observances
19th century in Madrid
May 1808 events
Massacres in Spain
Joachim Murat
Massacres committed by France